Edward Phelips  (1725–1797) was an English country landowner and politician who sat in the House of Commons from 1774 to 1780.
 
Phelips was the eldest son of Edward Phelips MP of Montacute House, and his second wife Elizabeth Phelips, daughter of his uncle Sir Edward Phelips, MP. He succeeded his father to Montacute in 1734.  He was educated at Westminster School from February 1737, and matriculated at  Christ Church, Oxford on 23 April 1741, aged 16. He married. Maria Wright, daughter of William Wright in about.1747  

The Public Ledger wrote of him that he “ seems much fitter for parish or turnpike business, than to be the representative of a great county in Parliament” and he is not recorded as   having spoken in Parliament. He did not stand again in 1780.

Phelips died in 1797. He and his wife Maria had four sons and two daughters. His eldest son Edward was also MP for Somerset.

References

1725 births
1797 deaths
Members of the Parliament of Great Britain for English constituencies
British MPs 1774–1780